Ponvaithanathar Temple (பொன்வைத்தநாதர் கோயில்) is a Hindu temple located near Aalathampadi between Thiruvarur and Thiruthuraipoondi in the Tiruvarur district of Tamil Nadu, India.

Significance 
It is one of the shrines of the 275 Paadal Petra Sthalams. Praises of the temple have been sung by the Saivite saints Appar and Sundarar.

References

External links 
 

Shiva temples in Tiruvarur district
Padal Petra Stalam